Toast, Inc. is a cloud-based restaurant management software company based in Boston, Massachusetts. The company provides an all-in-one point of sale (POS) system built on the Android operating system.

History

Toast's founders—Steve Fredette, Aman Narang, and Jonathan Grimm—initially created a consumer app centered for mobile payments, customer loyalty, promotions, and social aspects that integrated with restaurants’ existing POS systems.

In February 2020, Toast received $400 million in a round of Series F funding including Bessemer Venture Partners and TPG, at a valuation of $4.9 billion. , Toast is used in approximately 62,000 US restaurants.

In April 2020, Toast laid off 50% of its workforce due to the COVID-19 pandemic and its economic impact on the restaurant industry.

In November 2020, Toast has a secondary sale that valued the company at around $8 billion, despite laying off half of its employees in April. On September 22, 2021, Toast went public with an initial public offering under the stock symbol TOST. The company offered shares at $40 initially, with a market capitalization of roughly $20 billion, making it one of 2021's largest American IPOs.

In February 2023, it was announced Toast had acquired the Costa Mesa-headquartered producer of digital display solutions and drive-thru technology for quick-service restaurants (QSRs), Delphi Display Systems.

Products
First launched in March 2020, Toast's restaurant management system operates on the Android operating system and includes four devices: Flex (a terminal available in single-screen, guest-facing and kitchen displays), Tap (a three-in-one payment processing device that supports contactless payments), Toast Hub, and receipt printer.

Recognition

In May 2016, the New England Venture Capital Association (NEVCA) named Toast the winner of the Hottest Startup: A+ at the 2016 NEVY awards.

References

External links

Companies based in Boston
Companies listed on the New York Stock Exchange
Payment systems
Point of sale companies
Android (operating system) software
Mobile technology
Business software
Cloud computing providers
Technology companies of the United States
Customer loyalty programs
2021 initial public offerings